USS Neoga (YTB-263) was laid down as YT–263, 24 December 1943, by the J.M. Martinac Shipbuilding Corp., Tacoma, Washington; named Neoga 28 April 1944; reclassified YTB–263, 15 May 1944; launched 13 June 1944; and placed in service 21 October 1944.

Service life

Neoga, a harbor tug, performed towing, docking, berthing, firefighting, and salvage services in the 14th Naval District, headquartered at Pearl Harbor, throughout her career. Redesignated YTM–263 in February 1962, she was placed out of service and struck from the Navy List 1 May 1965.

References 
 
 Online: Service Ship Photo Archive Neoga (YTB-263)
 Shipbuilding History.com website

Tugs of the United States Navy
1944 ships
Ships built in Tacoma, Washington